Tribune Township is the sole township in Greeley County, Kansas, USA.   As of the 2010 census, its population was 1,247.

Geography

According to the USGS, it contains one cemetery, Bethany.

The streams of Middle Ladder Creek and South Ladder Creek run through this township.

Greeley County was previously divided into three townships.  However, in 1992, Colony Township and Harrison Township were merged into Tribune Township, leaving only one township for the county.  This was not reported to the U.S. census until 2006, thus the 2000 census did not reflect the merger, but the 2010 census did.

In the 2000 U.S. census, the population within the former boundaries of Tribune Township was reported as 1,255.  By the 2010 census, the entire county population (which is co-extensive with Tribune Township) was 1,247.

References

 USGS Geographic Names Information System (GNIS)

External links
 US-Counties.com
 City-Data.com

Townships in Greeley County, Kansas
Townships in Kansas